Chrysaeglia xantha is a moth of the subfamily Arctiinae. It was described by Yasunori Kishida in 1996. It is found on Sulawesi.

References

Lithosiini
Moths described in 1996